"The Shake" is a song written by Jon McElroy and Butch Carr, and recorded by American country music artist Neal McCoy.  It was released May 1997 as the only single from McCoy's Greatest Hits compilation album.  The song reached number 5 on the Billboard Hot Country Singles & Tracks chart in October 1997. It peaked at number 7 on the Canadian RPM Country Tracks.

Music video
The music video was directed by Chris Rogers and premiered in June 1997. In it a teenage boy walks in, and Neal's mom (played as an homage to Leave It to Beaver). The song starts, and he and his band are playing in the garage. The video ends with the mother starting to dance.

Critical reception
Robert Loy of Country Standard Time described the song negatively, saying that it was "a puerile and sexist hymn to feminine derriere movement[…]And that's good because the only thing saving lyrics like 'Shake it real funky/Shake it real low/Shake it till you just can't shake it no more' from being offensive is that they're so incredibly stupid."

Chart performance
"The Shake" debuted at number 67 on the U.S. Billboard Hot Country Singles & Tracks for the week of May 24, 1997.

Year-end charts

References

1997 singles
Neal McCoy songs
Song recordings produced by Kyle Lehning
Atlantic Records singles
1997 songs
Songs about dancing